Piazza dei Signori may refer to:

 Piazza delle Erbe, Verona
 Piazza delle Erbe, Mantua
 Piazza delle Erbe, Padua